Ursula Karusseit (2 August 1939 – 1 February 2019) was a German actress.

Life and career 
Karusseit was born in Elbing, Germany (now Elbląg, Poland). After the expulsion from her hometown, she grew up Parchim and Gera. She studied at the State drama school in East Berlin until 1962 and gave her TV debut in "Was ihr wollt" (an adaption of Shakespeare's Twelfth Night) in 1963. Karrusseit appeared for a long time at the Volksbühne and became one of the most prominent stage actresses in East Germany. 
From 1986 on she worked for appeared for three years as "Mother Courage" in Cologne.

In addition to her stage career, she also appeared in over 50 films and numerous television productions. Her role as Gertrud Habersaat in the TV-mini series Ways across the Country in 1968 also made her a well-known name in West Germany.  In 1971 she portrayed German resistance fighter Hilda Coppi in Horst E. Brandt's KLK Calling PTZ – The Red Orchestra.

After the German reunification, she appeared for twenty years until her death in the German hospital series In aller Freundschaft, playing the operator of the hospital's cafeteria.

Karusseit married Benno Besson in 1969 and held Swiss citizenship through her marriage. She died of heart problems in Berlin, aged 79, on 1 February 2019.

Filmography

Awards 
 1968: National Prize of the German Democratic Republic
 2009:  (German media prize) for her lifetime achievement

References

External links

1939 births
2019 deaths
German film actresses
German television actresses
People from Elbląg
People from East Prussia
Ernst Busch Academy of Dramatic Arts alumni
20th-century German actresses
21st-century German actresses
German soap opera actresses
East German actors
East German women